Seri obscuripennis is a species of fly in the genus Seri.

References

Platypezidae
Insects described in 1917
Taxa named by Lorenz Oldenberg